is a Japanese light novel series written by Ryo Shirakome and illustrated by Takayaki. Originally a web novel, the series was published in print from June 2015 to September 2022. The series follows Hajime Nagumo, who is transported to another world with the rest of his class to fight in a war against the demon race. After he is betrayed and left to die by one of his classmates, Hajime begins a journey to improve himself and find a way to return home. The novels are licensed in English by J-Novel Club, with Seven Seas Entertainment publishing them in print. The English translation of the light novel was done by Murtaza Burhan. A prequel light novel was published in 2017.

The series has received a manga adaptation, serialized on Ovelap's Comic Gardo website since 2016, as well as a yonkoma comedy spinoff and a manga adaptation of the prequel novel, all three licensed by Seven Seas. An anime television series adaptation by White Fox and Asread aired from July to October 2019. A second season by Asread and Studio Mother aired from January to March 2022. A third season has been announced.

Plot 
High-schooler Hajime Nagumo is bullied by some of his classmates for his relationship with the class idol, Kaori. When he and the rest of his class are transported to a fantasy world, all of his classmates get powerful magical abilities, while Hajime only gains the basic alchemical magic to transmute solid materials, a common ability usually found in craftsmen and smiths. During a dungeon raid, he is betrayed by one of his classmates and dropped to the bottom of the dungeon. He survives the fall and creates weapons to escape the dungeon and become stronger. On his journey, he meets with the imprisoned vampire Yue, and later is joined by the bunny-eared Shea, the perverted dragon Tio, and others.

Characters

Main characters 

The central main protagonist/character. A high-school otaku student who is transported along with his classmates to another world, where he only gains a very low-level transmutation skill. During the first hike in the Orcus dungeon, Hajime uses his skill to protect his classmates, just to be betrayed by one of them and thrown straight into the abyss of the dungeon. Left for dead, and after losing an arm to one of the monsters, he stumbles upon a very rare mineral with healing properties, which grants him the ability to survive by eating the bodies of monsters he defeats while obtaining their abilities allowing him to grow stronger at an accelerated rate. After rescuing Yue and conquering the dungeon, Hajime learns the secret to why the dungeons were created and was granted its treasures. Since then he decides to conquer all 7 dungeons, to get all the ancient magics and use them to return to his home world. Over time, Hajime grows ruthless and cynical as he fights to survive and protect others, but starts displaying glimpses of the lost kindness he once had while interacting with the rest of his party. During his time in the Orcus Dungeon, Hajime also became a self-taught master gunsmith, by applying his otaku knowledge based on science fiction and military technology, creating powerful alchemical artillery, tools and even vehicles and water vessels for he and his party to use. His job class is Synergist.

A vampire princess who was betrayed and imprisoned by her uncle and retainers in the bottom of the Labyrinth of Oscar Orcus for 300 years, until Hajime discovered and freed her using his transmutation skill. She is a magical prodigy that can use all elemental types of magic and also has automatic regeneration that keeps her from aging and heals her wounds very quickly. She fell in love with Hajime and became his first companion. Yue does not show any jealousy when other girls approach Hajime, but affirms herself as his first and official wife. It is soon revealed that the reason she was betrayed was to protect her from being a vessel to the fallen God Ehit, due to her overwhelming power. Her job class is Divine Priestess upon joining Hajime on his journey.

A rabbit-girl who Hajime and Yue encounter. She is different from the rest of her clan because she has the ability to foresee the future, causing her have to abandon the homeland together with her clan. She also possessed monstrous strength and uses one of Hajime's custom-made weapons, a warhammer called Drucken when engaged in fights. She also develops feelings for Hajime after he helps her village and pursues him relentlessly, making Hajime find her annoying sometimes. Shea also developing a sister-like bond with Yue despite being her love rival for Hajime. Her job class is Diviner due to her future foreseeing ability.

Tio is a pervert in ways of physically and emotionally, but she is honest and the way she speaks are similar to the old legends. Her perverted and masochistic personality is a result from countless assault by Hajime after her defeat to Hajime's group. She devoted herself to Hajime to become his slave after he saves her from Shimizu's mind control ability and calls Hajime "Master." Tio originally came from the dragon-born tribe. Her parents sacrificed themselves when fighting against the god centuries ago while hoping their daughter will find the person who can eventually defeat the god one day. Her magic and defense are significantly high especially in her Dragon form, even Hajime's party attacks only cracked the scales of this dragon. She is 563 years old and initially respected by Yue. Her appearance is a woman of her 20s with "watermelon" chests and golden eyes. Her dragon form is a few meters long with golden eyes and has black dragon scales. Her job class is it Guardian.

One of Hajime's classmates and the class idol. She was the only one to actively speak to Hajime, going so far as to research manga, anime and even eroge to hold conversations with him. However, Kaori realized her feelings only after Hajime fell into the abyss, and was also the only one who did not believe in his death. After meeting him again, she was initially frightened by how ruthless Hajime had become, but eventually overcame her fear and confessed her love, joining him on his journey, usually competing with Yue and the others for his affection. She has the job class of Healer after being transported to another world. 

She is Kaori's best friend and a childhood friend of Kouki. She is a hardworking, kind and caring girl who passes her time practicing her kendo skills. She is extremely sharp and is usually capable of processing things without much explanation. She is one of the more realistic among her classmates and acts as the voice of reason and caution, instead of blindly rushing in like her classmates. She is referred to as a cool beauty, but has a secret girlish side that likes cute things, cats and stuffed dolls. Later, she received one of Hajime's masterpieces, a black Kissaki Moroha Zukuri Shirasaya Katana made of the hardest mineral of Azanthium, as her new weapon, allowing her to utilize her samurai swordsmanship techniques to the fullest. Her job class is Swordmaster. After conquering Sea of Tree Labyrinth, her feelings for Hajime started to grow and she herself became aware of it. In the fight of last Labyrinth between her and her opponent, a clone of herself, in an attempt to finish her off, speaks to her of all her inner feelings and the guilt of loving her best friend's lover. Hajime saved her in time and encouraged her to win the fight. After meeting other party members and Hajime's harem girls, she confessed to him her love in front of them, saying that "She will do everything to make him herself" and began showing her cute and girlish sides to Hajime's party.

Summoned class 
 

A school teacher who got transported to the other world along with the rest of the class. When she saw Hajime and found that he was alive, she was shocked by the sudden changes in his appearance and mood, but fell in love with him when he saved her from poisoning, giving her an antidote through mouth-to-mouth. She was very shocked that Hajime killed Yukitoshi Shimizu without a drop of regret, but soon found out that Hajime did it for her own protection. At first, she did not recognize her feelings, arguing that she and Hajime were a teacher and student, but soon overpowered this and recognized her love for the young man. She is also the goddess of plenty and a hero who manages to expose Ehit's evil, allowing everyone who was deceived for worshipping the fallen God to unite for an uprising against him. Her job class is Farmer.

The summoned Hero, he sincerely believes in his own righteousness and tries to impose it on others, and considers those opinions that do not coincide with his thoughts to be erroneous. He was the only one who did not know about Kaori’s true feelings for Hajime. When Kouki saw how Hajime changed, he began to despise him and consider him a villain as he thought that he forced Yue and the others to help him. When Kaori confessed to Hajime that she loved him and wanted to go with him, Kouki began to jealously protest, arguing that he and Kaori were childhood friends and should always be together. Following the demon's invasion of the Heiligh Capital, Kouki demanded to be allowed to join Hajime's party in conquering the remaining Labyrinths, so that he could get stronger and prove his ideals are more effective that Hajime's. However, his continued failings causes Kouki to spiral into further denial and depression, particularly after he succumbs to a Labyrinth's temptation and learning of Shizuku's own confession to Hajime.

 One of Hajime's classmates and best friend of Kouki. Though at times rash and eager to rush into battle, he genuinely cares about his friends. He fights using his bare hands and possesses superhuman strength. His job class is Monk.

 One of Hajime's classmates and part of the Hero's Party initially. She is devastated by Eri's betrayal and the revelation that she only ever saw Suzu as cover for her true personality and not a friend. Despite this, Suzu resolves to speak to Eri again and tags along with Hajime's party to conquer other Labyrinths to become strong enough to do so. Her job class is Barrier Master.

 One of Hajime's classmates, who chose to stop training with the Hero's Party in the Labyrinth following Hajime's supposed death. Feeling indebted after being saved by Hajime in the Labyrinth, she strives to not waste his sacrifice and instead aid Aiko's efforts in the Kingdom. She is relieved when Hajime later shows up alive. Her classmates later start to tease her about becoming Hajime's mistress despite her protests that she doesn't have feelings for him. Her job class is Acrobat, which makes her highly proficient with knives.

A classmate of Hajime's who was initially a part of the Hero's Party training in the Orcus Labyrinth. Due to having a "weak presence", he is often accidentally overlooked and forgotten by his classmates, an unfortunate trait that has been enhanced since arriving on Tortus. After being sent off to find help by the rest of his friends, Kousuke pleaded for Hajime's aid during Cattleya's attack on the Hero's Party. Following Eri and Hiyama's betrayal, he is left more despondent due to feeling guilt that he could have saved Captain Meld, and so remains in the capital with most of the rest of the class. His job class is Assassin.

Antagonists 
 

A classmate of Hajime's who used to bully him due to jealousy over Kaori's closeness to him. During a boss fight inside the dungeon, he secretly attacked Hajime with fire magic, causing him to fall into the abyss. Upon learning that Hajime was alive, in fear, he tried to deny it. He has a maniac desire to possess Kaori, which is why he made a deal with Eri Nakamura to turn Kaori into an undead puppet for his own enjoyment. Hiyama was subsequently beaten to near-death by Hajime and finally killed and eaten by the monsters after Hajime tossed him to them  during the invasion of the capital.

A classmate of Hajime's. Though initially seeming to be a kind-hearted girl, she soon reveals her true nature as a deranged and manipulative psychopath obsessed with Kouki during the demons' invasion. After initially blackmailing Hiyama for his attempt on Hajime's life, she later started working with the demons and Noint, resurrecting several Heiligh nobles and soldiers killed by the monsters as undead puppets under her control. After revealing her true nature and betraying the rest of her class, resulting in the death of one classmate at her own hand, Eri later retreats with the demons. Her job class is Necromancer.

One of the summoned class who felt unappreciated and ended up accepting the demons' offer to help raise an army of monsters and lead them into battle to kill Aiko. After his army is defeated by Hajime's party, he refutes Aiko's reconciliation, but is fatally wounded by a demon attempting to assassinate Aiko. Despite his pleading, Hajime chooses to kill Shimizu instead of saving  him, though only to spare Aiko the guilt of being responsible for his death.

A demon under the charge of Freid, assigned with conquering the Great Orcus Labyrinth and to either recruit or kill the hero and his party using several enhanced monsters provided to her by Freid. In the end, she was killed by Hajime, prompting Mikhail, her lover, to try to avenge her.

An apostle serving Ehit's will, usually to sow discord among the humans, demons and beastmen for her master's amusement. She kidnapped Aiko to keep her from revealing the truth about Ehit's goals to the summoned class, and fought against Hajime while the demons were attempting to invade the Heiligh capital. She was killed by Hajime eventually and her body is preserved for the resurrection of Kaori who was killed by Daisuke.

The supreme commander of the demons' army. Despite having conquered two of the Great Labyrinths, he refuses to believe the Liberators' claim that Ehit is evil and keeps following him, determined to do his bidding and wage war against the humans. Freid is a recurrent opponent of Hajime and his party, but always fails to defeat them.

A demon under Fried's command, and Cattleya's lover who swears vengeance on Hajime's party after learning of her death. He is killed in combat by Shea.

The series's main antagonist, Ehit is known as a god, but he was originally as born a man who attained immortality and became revered as a god instead. After ruling the world of Tortus for many years, Ehit decides to turn it into a "chessboard of life and death", pitting the races against each other into a state of perpetual war just for his amusement.

Other characters 

She is a young mer-folk (dagon) girl from Erisen who got kidnapped to be sold as a slave, but was saved by Hajime and his companions twice when they came across her in Fuhren. Initially, she refers to Hajime as "Onii-chan" (Big Brother), but later calls him "Papa" (Father), much to Kaori's chagrin. Even though Hajime reluctantly becomes her father, he becomes overprotective of her when someone tried to make her cry, thus revealing his parental figures in front of his companions.

The princess of the Heiligh Kingdom who becomes friends with several members of the summoned class, including Kaori and Shizuku. After witnessing Noint kidnapping Aiko, Liliana set out to find Hajime's party to ask for their aid. Following the demons' attack, she resolves herself to being married into the family of another nation's rulers. But after nearly being assaulted by her betrothed and rescued by Hajime, she started to develop feelings for him, even in spite of Hajime's typical lack of courtesy towards her.

Myu's mother, who is also a mer-folk/dagon-type demihuman from Erisen. She was injured by slavers when her daughter was kidnapped, although when Hajime's party returned her to Erisen, Kaori helped to heal Remia's legs. She encourages Myu's attachment to Hajime and enjoys flirting with him.

One of the Liberators who opposed god, and the creator of the Great Orcus Labyrinth. An old recording of Oscar was seen by Hajime and Yue after they conquered his dungeon, from which he posthumously revealed the truth about Ehit and the Liberators. Like Hajime, Oscar was a Synergist and because of their shared expertise in creating a number of artifacts, Hajime considers Oscar to be a sort of mentor despite having never actually met. Oscar is the protagonist of the prequel series Arifureta: From Commonplace to World's Strongest Zero.

One of the Liberators who opposed god long ago, who has survived to the present day by transferring her soul into golems she created. She is loud, boisterous and mischievous, with her practical jokes and overall personality completely irritating Hajime, Yue and Shea when they challenge her Labyrinth in Reisen Gorge.

Publication 

Ryo Shirakome originally published the series as a web novel on the user-submitted content site Shōsetsuka ni Narō. The main story ran for eight books from November 7, 2013, to October 31, 2015, and has been followed by three after-stories and an extra story since. The series was picked up for publication by Overlap, and they released the first light novel, with illustrations by Takayaki, under their Overlap Bunko imprint in June 2015. When the anime adaptation was announced to have been delayed until 2019, the eighth volume of the light novel was also delayed by a month, from March to April 2018. The series ended with the release of its thirteenth volume.

A prequel light novel series titled , or Arifureta Zero, was published from December 2017 to December 2021 in six volumes.

Digital publisher J-Novel Club licensed the series for an English release, and published the first chapter on February 21, 2017. During their panel at Anime Expo 2017, Seven Seas Entertainment announced that they would publish a print version of the novels as part of their collaboration with J-Novel Club. J-Novel Club has also licensed Arifureta Zero, and the series was the publisher's first simultaneous publication.

Media

Manga 

A manga adaptation by RoGa has been published on Ovelap's Comic Gardo website since its inception on December 22, 2016, and the first volume was published three days later on December 25 to coincide with the release of the fifth light novel. The series has been licensed by Seven Seas Entertainment.

A yonkoma comedy spinoff by Misaki Mori, titled , began serialization on Overlap's Comic Gardo website on July 11, 2017. Seven Seas announced their license to the series on January 10, 2019.

An adaptation of the prequel light novel Arifureta: From Commonplace to World’s Strongest Zero by Ataru Kamichi began serialization on February 23, 2018, on the Comic Gardo website. Seven Seas announced their license to the series on January 10, 2019.

Audio drama 
A series of two drama CDs were released with the seventh, eighth, and tenth volumes of the light novel on December 25, 2017, April 25, 2018, and June 25, 2019. The drama CDs share the same voice cast as the anime.

Anime 

An anime television series adaptation was announced on December 3, 2017. The series was initially intended to premiere in April 2018, but on January 15, 2018, its release was pushed back due to "various circumstances". Originally, the series would have been directed by Jun Kamiya and written by Kazuyuki Fudeyasu, with animation by studio White Fox and character designs by Atsuo Tobe, who also would have served as chief animation director. However, following the postponement, it was announced on April 29, 2018, that Kinji Yoshimoto would be taking over as director and studio Asread would be joining White Fox as animators. Additionally, Chika Kojima took over from Atsuo Tobe as character designer to adapt Takayaki's original designs, and Kazuyuki Fudeyasu left his position as scriptwriter, being replaced by Shoichi Sato and Kinji Yoshimoto. Ryō Takahashi composed the series' music. Void_Chords feat. LIO performed the series' opening theme "FLARE", while DracoVirgo performs the series' ending theme .

The series aired from July 8 to October 7, 2019, on AT-X, Tokyo MX, SUN, and BS11. It ran for 13 episodes. Two original video animations (OVA) were released with the second and third home video sets on December 25, 2019, and February 26, 2020. 

Funimation had licensed the series for an English simulcast and SimulDub. Following Sony's acquisition of Crunchyroll, the series was moved to Crunchyroll.

After the first season's finale, it was announced that the series would receive a second season. Akira Iwanaga replaced Kinji Yoshimoto as director, and Studio Mother replaced White Fox as the secondary studio. The rest of the staff and cast returned to reprise their roles. It aired from January 13 to March 31, 2022, on AT-X, Tokyo MX, and BS11, and is available to watch on iQiyi. A two-part OVA was released on September 25, 2022 titled .

On September 10, 2022, it was announced that a third season is in production. Asread is animating the season, with Akira Iwanaga, Shoichi Sato, and Chika Kojima returning as director, scriptwriter, and character designer, respectively.

Reception 
The series was the 27th best-selling light novel series in the first half of 2017, with 84,372 copies sold.

Rebecca Silverman of Anime News Network enjoyed the series, praising it for its central premise and how it was "good twist on the genre conventions" by making its hero have to work for his overpowered hero status instead of immediately gaining it like many light novel protagonists. She criticized the series for its depiction of the romantic relationship between Hajime and Yue, which she called "unhealthy", and also felt that the translation wasn't as good as some of J-Novel Club's other releases.

The anime adaptation was subjected to extremely sharp and negative criticism. Christopher Farris of the Anime News Network, cited manufacturing issues as the main causes of the series's failure. Farris points to the poor quality of the animation and the first episode missing most of the original source of the original novel.

See also
 My Stepmom's Daughter Is My Ex, another light novel series illustrated by the same illustrator

References

External links 
  at Shōsetsuka ni Narō 
  
  
  
  
  at J-Novel Club
 

2019 anime television series debuts
2015 Japanese novels
2017 Japanese novels
Anime and manga based on light novels
Asread
AT-X (TV network) original programming
Crunchyroll anime
Harem anime and manga
Isekai anime and manga
J-Novel Club books
Light novels
Light novels first published online
Overlap Bunko
Seven Seas Entertainment titles
Shōsetsuka ni Narō
Shōnen manga
Upcoming anime television series
White Fox
Yonkoma